The Sea of Japan  is the marginal sea between the Japanese archipelago, Sakhalin, the Korean Peninsula, and the mainland of the Russian Far East. The Japanese archipelago separates the sea from the Pacific Ocean. Like the Mediterranean Sea, it has almost no tides due to its nearly complete enclosure from the Pacific Ocean. This isolation also affects faunal diversity and salinity, both of which are lower than in the open ocean. The sea has no large islands, bays or capes. Its water balance is mostly determined by the inflow and outflow through the straits connecting it to the neighboring seas and the Pacific Ocean. Few rivers discharge into the sea and their total contribution to the water exchange is within 1%.

The seawater has an elevated concentration of dissolved oxygen that results in high biological productivity. Therefore, fishing is the dominant economic activity in the region. The intensity of shipments across the sea has been moderate owing to political issues, but it is steadily increasing as a result of the growth of East Asian economies.

Names
Sea of Japan is the dominant term used in English for the sea, and the name in most European languages is equivalent, but it is sometimes called by different names in surrounding countries.

The sea is called Rìběn hǎi (日本海, literally "Japan Sea") or originally Jīng hǎi (鲸海, literally "Whale Sea") in China, Yaponskoye more (Японское море, literally "Japanese Sea") in Russia, Chosŏn Tonghae (조선동해, literally "Korean East Sea") in North Korea, and Donghae (동해, literally "East Sea") in South Korea. A naming dispute exists about the sea name, with South Korea promoting the English translation of its native name as the East Sea.

Naming dispute

The use of the term "Sea of Japan" as the dominant name is a point of contention. South Korea wants the name "East Sea" to be used, either instead of or in addition to "Sea of Japan;" while North Korea prefers the name "East Sea of Korea".

The primary issue in the dispute revolves around a disagreement about when the name "Sea of Japan" became the international standard. Japan claims the term has been the international standard since at least the early 19th century, while the Koreas claim that the term "Sea of Japan" arose later while Korea was under Japanese rule, and before that occupation, other names such as "Sea of Korea" or "East Sea" were used in English. The sea is referred to as the Sea of Japan according to the Encyclopædia Britannica. In 2012, the International Hydrographic Organization (IHO), the intergovernmental organization that maintains a publication listing the limits of ocean and sea areas around the world, abandoned its most recent of several attempts in the last 25 years to revise its publication of the sea's name. This was primarily because of the lack of agreement between the Koreas and Japan over the naming issue. In September 2020, the IHO announced that it would adopt a new numerical system, also known as "S-130". In November 2020, S-23, the previous version of the nautical chart made in 1953 will be made public as an IHO publication to demonstrate the evolutionary process from the analogue to the digital era. The IHO approved the proposal of the new official nautical chart. The new chart will be marked with a numerical identifier without a name.

History
For centuries, the sea had protected Japan from land invasions, particularly by the Mongols. It had long been navigated by Asian and, from the 18th century, by European ships. Russian expeditions of 1733–1743 mapped Sakhalin and the Japanese islands. In the 1780s, the Frenchman Jean-François de Galaup, comte de Lapérouse, traveled northward across the sea through the strait later named after him. In 1796, a British naval officer, William Robert Broughton explored the Strait of Tartary, the eastern coast of the Russian Far East and the Korean Peninsula.

In 1803–1806, the Russian navigator Adam Johann von Krusenstern while sailing across the globe in the ship Nadezhda also explored, in passing, the Sea of Japan and the eastern shores of Japanese islands. In 1849, another Russian explorer Gennady Nevelskoy discovered the strait between the continent and Sakhalin and mapped the northern part of the Strait of Tartary. Russian expeditions were made in 1853–1854 and 1886–1889 to measure the surface temperatures and record the tides. They also documented the cyclonal character of the sea currents.

Other notable expeditions of the 19th century include the American North Pacific Exploring and Surveying Expedition (1853–1856) and British Challenger expedition (1872–1876). The aquatic life was described by V. K. Brazhnikov in 1899–1902 and P. Yu. Schmidt in 1903–1904. The Japanese scientific studies of the sea began only in 1915 and became systematic since the 1920s.

American, Canadian and French whaleships cruised for whales in the sea between 1847 and 1892. Most entered the sea via Korea Strait and left via La Pérouse Strait, but some entered and exited via Tsugaru Strait. They primarily targeted right whales, but began catching humpbacks as right whale catches declined. They also made attempts to catch blue and fin whales, but these species invariably sank after being killed. Right whales were caught from March to September, with peak catches in May and June. During the peak years of 1848 and 1849 a total of over 170 vessels (over 60 in 1848, and over 110 in 1849) cruised in the Sea of Japan, with significantly lesser numbers in following years.

Geography and geology

The Sea of Japan was landlocked when the land bridge of East Asia existed. The Japan Arc started to form in the Early Miocene. In the Early Miocene the Japan Sea started to open, and the northern and southern parts of the Japanese archipelago separated from each other. During the Miocene, the Sea of Japan expanded.

The north part of the Japanese archipelago was further fragmented later until orogenesis of the north-eastern Japanese archipelago began in the later Late Miocene. The south part of the Japanese archipelago remained as a relatively large landmass. The land area had expanded northward in the Late Miocene. The orogenesis of high mountain ranges in north-eastern Japan started in Late Miocene and lasted in Pliocene also. The eastern margin of the sea may host an incipient subduction zone responsible for large earthquakes in 1940, 1964, 1983 and 1993.

Nowadays the Sea of Japan is bounded by the Russian mainland and Sakhalin island to the north, the Korean Peninsula to the west, and the Japanese islands of Hokkaidō, Honshū and Kyūshū to the east and south. It is connected to other seas by five straits: the Strait of Tartary between the Asian mainland and Sakhalin; La Pérouse Strait between the Sakhalin and Hokkaidō; the Tsugaru Strait between Hokkaidō and Honshū; the Kanmon Straits between Honshū and Kyūshū; and the Korea Strait between the Korean Peninsula and Kyūshū.

The Korea Strait is composed of the Western Channel and the Tsushima Strait, on either side of Tsushima Island. The straits were formed in recent geologic periods. The oldest of them are the Tsugaru and Tsushima straits. Their formation had interrupted the migration of elephants into the Japanese islands at the end of the Neogene Period (about 2.6 million years ago). The most recent is La Perouse Strait, which formed about 60,000 to 11,000 years ago closing the path used by mammoths which had earlier moved to northern Hokkaidō. All the straits are rather shallow with a minimal depth of the order of 100 meters or less. This hinders water exchange, thereby isolating the water and aquatic life of the Sea of Japan from the neighboring seas and oceans.

It has a carrot-like shape, with the major axis extending from south-west to north-east and a wide southern part narrowing toward the north.

It has three major basins: the Yamato Basin in the south-east, the Japan Basin in the north and the Tsushima Basin (Ulleung Basin) in the south-west. The Japan Basin is of oceanic origin and is the deepest part of the sea, whereas the Tsushima Basin is the shallowest with the depths below .

There are three distinct continental shelves in the northern part (above 44° N). The last step sharply drops to the depths of about  toward the central (deepest) part of the sea. The bottom of this part is relatively flat, but has a few plateaus. In addition, an underwater ridge rising up to  runs from north to south through the middle of the central part.

The Japanese coastal area of the sea consists of Okujiri Ridge, Sado Ridge, Hakusan Banks, Wakasa Ridge and Oki Ridge. Yamato Ridge is of continental origin and is composed of granite, rhyolite, andesite and basalt. It has an uneven bottom covered with boulders of volcanic rock. Most other areas of the sea are of oceanic origin. Pelagic sediments of red mud dominate the deeper regions.

There are no large islands in the sea. Most of the smaller ones are near the eastern coast, except for Ulleungdo (South Korea). The most significant islands are Moneron, Rebun, Rishiri, Okushiri, Ōshima, Sado, Okinoshima, Ulleungdo, Askold, Russky and Putyatin. The shorelines are relatively straight and are lacking large bays or capes; the coastal shapes are simplest for Sakhalin and are more winding in the Japanese islands.

The largest bays are Peter the Great Gulf, Sovetskaya Gavan; Vladimira Bay, Olga; Posyet Bay in Russia; East Korea Bay in North Korea; and Ishikari (Hokkaidō), Toyama (Honshū), and Wakasa (Honshū) Bays in Japan. Prominent capes include Lazareva, Peschanyi (sandy), Povorotny, Gromova, Pogibi, Tyk, and Korsakova in Russia; Crillon on Sakhalin; Sōya, Nosappu, Tappi, Nyuda, Rebun, Rishiri, Okushiri, Daso and Oki in Japan; and Musu Dan in North Korea.

As world sea level dropped during the ice cap advances of the last Ice Age, the exit straits of the Sea of Japan one by one dried and closed. There is controversy as to whether or not in each ice cap advance the world sea level fell low enough for the deepest, the western channel of the Korea Strait, to dry and close, turning the Sea of Japan into a huge cold inland lake with a surface layer of fresh water, freezing over in the winters.

Climate

The sea climate is characterized by warm waters and monsoons. This combination results in strong evaporation, which is especially noticeable between October and March when the strong ( or higher) north-western monsoon wind brings cold and dry continental air. The evaporation is blown further south causing snowfall in the mountainous western coasts of Japan. This winter monsoon brings typhoons and storms with the waves reaching  which erode the western coasts of Japan. Tsunami waves were also recorded in the sea.

The northern one-quarter of the sea, particularly the Siberian coast and the Strait of Tartary, freezes for about 4−5 months. The timing and extent of freezing vary from year to year, so ice may start forming in the bays as early as in October and its remains may be seen even in June. Ice cover is continuous only in the bays and forms floating patches in the open sea. Ice melting in spring results in cold currents in the northern areas.

A peculiar turbulent cloud pattern, named von Kármán vortices, is sometimes observed over the Sea of Japan. It requires a stable field of low clouds driven by the wind over a small (isolated) and tall obstacle, and usually forms over small mountainous islands. The Sea of Japan meets these conditions as it has frequent winds and cloudy skies, as well as compact, tall islands such as Rishiri, Ulleungdo and Ōshima.

Extent

The International Hydrographic Organization defines the limits of the "Japan Sea" as follows:

Hydrology

The sea currents circulate in the counterclockwise direction. The Kuroshio (Japan Current), the Tsushima Current and the East Korea Warm Current bring warmer and more saline water to the north. There they merge into the Tsugaru Current and flow into the Pacific Ocean through the Tsugaru Strait. They also feed the Sōya Current and exit through the La Perouse Strait to the Sea of Okhotsk. The returning branch is composed of the Liman, North Korea and Central (or Mid-) Japan Sea currents which bring fresh and cold water along the Asian coast to the south.

Water temperature is mostly affected by exchange with the atmosphere in the northern part of the sea and by the currents in the southern part. In this season, there is a significant temperature difference between the western and eastern parts owing to the circular currents.

As a result of the enclosed nature of the sea, its waters form clearly separated layers which may show seasonal and spatial dependence. In winter, the temperature is almost constant with the depth in the northern part of the sea. Heating by the sun and tropical monsoons increases the depth gradient in spring–summer.

The hydrological isolation of the Sea of Japan also results in slightly lower average water salinity (34.09‰, where ‰ means parts per thousand) compared with the Pacific Ocean. In winter, the highest salinity at 34.5‰ is observed in the south where evaporation dominates over precipitation. It is the lowest at 33.8‰ in the south-east and south-west because of frequent rains and remains at about 34.09‰ in most other parts.

Thawing of ice in spring reduces water salinity in the north, but it remains high at 34.60–34.70‰ in the south, partly because of the inflow of salty water through the Korea Strait. A typical variation of salinity across the sea in summer is 31.5‰ to 34.5‰ from north to south. The depth distribution of salinity is relatively constant. The surface layer tends to be more fresh in the sea parts which experience ice melting and rains. The average water density is 1.0270 g/cm3 in the north and 1.0255 g/cm3 in the south in winter. It lowers in summer to 1.0253 and 1.0215 g/cm3, respectively.

Few rivers flow into the Sea of Japan from mainland Asia, the largest being Tumen, Rudnaya, Samarga, Partizanskaya and Tumnin; all of them have mountainous character. In contrast, numerous large rivers flow from Honshū and Hokkaidō into the sea, including Japan's four largest rivers in the Shinano, Ishikari, Agano and Mogami. Rainfall, evaporation and riverine inflow make only 1% of the water balance. Between October and April, the outflow exceeds the inflow due to the lower income through the Korea Strait; this balance reverses between May and September.

The sea has complex tides, which are induced by the tidal wave of the Pacific Ocean penetrating through the Korea Strait and Tsugaru strait. The tides are semi-diurnal (rise twice a day) in the Korea Strait and in the northern part of the Strait of Tartary. They are diurnal at the eastern shore of Korea, Russian Far East and the Japanese islands of Honshū and Hokkaidō. Mixed tides occur in Peter the Great Gulf and Korea strait. They accelerate in the Korea Strait, La Pérouse Strait and especially in the Tsugaru Strait.

The amplitude of the tides is relatively low and strongly varies across the sea. Similar low tides are observed in Hokkaidō, Honshū and south Sakhalin. The amplitude however increases to  toward the north of the Strait of Tartary due to its funnel-like shape. Apart from tides, the water level also experiences seasonal, monsoon-related variations across the entire sea with the highest levels observed in summer and lowest in winter.

They are rich in dissolved oxygen, especially in the western and northern parts, which are colder and have more phytoplankton than the eastern and southern areas.

Flora and fauna

The high concentration of dissolved oxygen results in the rich aquatic life of the Sea of Japan – there are more than 800 species of aquatic plants and more than 3,500 animal species, including more than 900 species of crustaceans, about 1,000 of fish and 26 of mammals. The coastal areas contain several kg/m2 of biomass. Pelagic (oceanic) fishes include saury, mackerel, Jack mackerels, sardines, anchovies, herring, sea bream, squid and various species of salmon and trout. The demersal (sea-bottom) fishes include cod, pollock and Atka mackerel.

Mammals are represented by seals and whales (ancient name for the basin in Chinese was "Sea of Whales"), and the crustaceans by shrimps and crabs. Because of the shallow straits connecting the sea with Pacific Ocean, the Sea of Japan has no characteristic oceanic deep-water fauna. Flora and fauna unique to the region near the Sea of Japan are known as "Japan Sea elements".

Economy

Fishery had long been the main economic activity on the Sea of Japan. It is mainly carried out on and near the continental shelves and focuses on herring, sardines and bluefin tuna. These species are however depleted from after World War II. Squid is mostly caught near the sea center and salmon near the northern and south-western shores. There is also a well-developed seaweed production.

The importance of the fishery in the sea is illustrated by the territorial disputes between Japan and South Korea over Liancourt Rocks and between Japan and Russia over the Kuril Islands. It is also reflected in various legends, such as the legend of the Heishi rock, which says that once when herring vanished, an old fairy threw a bottle with magic water into the sea, and the herring returned. The bottle got stuck to the seabed and turned into a rock, which became a representation of the God of the Sea of Japan.

Vladivostok is a base for the Russian whaling fleet. Although it operates in the northern seas, its production is processed and partly distributed in the Vladivostok area. Vladivostok is also a terminal point of the Trans-Siberian Railway which brings many goods to and from this major port. There is a regular ferry service across the Strait of Tartary between the Russian continental port of Vanino and Kholmsk in Sakhalin.

The sea has magnetite sands as well as natural gas and petroleum fields near the northern part of Japan and Sakhalin Island. The intensity of shipments across the sea is moderate, owing to the cold relations between many bordering countries. As a result, the largest Japanese ports are on the Pacific coast, and the significant ports on the Sea of Japan are Niigata, Tsuruta and Maizuru. Major South Korean ports are Busan, Ulsan, and Pohang situated on the south-eastern coast of the Korean Peninsula, but they also mainly target countries not bordering the Sea of Japan.

The major Russian port of Vladivostok mainly serves inland cargos, whereas Nakhodka and Vostochny are more international and have a busy exchange with Japan and South Korea. Other prominent Russian ports are Sovetskaya Gavan, Alexandrovsk-Sakhalinsky and Kholmsk, and the major ports of North Korea are Wonsan, Hamhung and Chongjin. The intensity of shipments across the Sea of Japan is steadily increasing as a result of the growth of East Asian economies.

See also
 Geography of Japan
 Geography of Korea
 Geography of North Korea
 Geography of South Korea
 Geography of Russia
 :Category:Islands of the Sea of Japan

References
This article incorporates CC-BY-2.0 text from this reference:

Further reading 
 Fukuoka N. (1966). "On the distribution patterns of the so-called Japan Sea elements confined to the Sea of Japan region".  15: 63–80.

External links
 
 
 "The Issue of Name "Sea of Japan"", MOFA, Japan, 7 February 2017.　
 MOFA, Japan (10 August 2021), "Sea of Japan - The one and only name recognized by the international community" (Digest version), YouTube.

 
Bodies of water of Khabarovsk Krai
Bodies of water of Primorsky Krai
Bodies of water of Sakhalin Oblast
Geography of Japan
Geography of Korea
Geography of Northeast Asia
Geography of the Russian Far East
Marginal seas of the Pacific Ocean
Marine ecoregions
Miocene Asia
Pacific Coast of Russia
Japan
Japan
Japan
Japan
Temperate Northern Pacific